Vermont Route 120 (VT 120) is a  state highway located in Franklin County, Vermont, United States. The route begins at an intersection with VT 105 in the town of Sheldon, beginning as a north–south route until the junction with VT 235. At that junction, the route begins a west–east progression, reaching a junction with VT 108 in the town of Berkshire. The route was designated as a decision of the Vermont State Legislature in 1961.

Route description 

VT 120 begins at an intersection with VT 105 in the town of Sheldon as a state-maintained continuation of nearby Kane Road. VT 120 runs north from the banks of the Missisquoi River into the small hamlet of North Sheldon. Very little defines North Sheldon, which the route leaves almost immediately as it bends northwest at Skunks Misery Road. VT 120 passes a nearby junction with Swamp Road, which connects the route to Lake Carmi State Park via nearby VT 236. VT 120 runs north–northwest through Sheldon, soon reaching the town line of Franklin. Known for a short time as North Sheldon Road, the route passes well west of Lake Carmi, and soon changes monikers to Main Street as it enters the center of Franklin. Through Franklin, VT 120 is the main northwest–southeast thoroughfare, soon reaching a junction with the eastern terminus of VT 235 (Morses Line Road), which connects to QC 235 at the Morses Line Border Crossing.

VT 120 turns east at the junction with VT 235, changing names to Lake Road, running east through the fields of Franklin near the Canada–United States border. After Riley Road, the route bends northeast and soon reaches the northern shore of Lake Camri. At Dewing Road, the route passes Mill Pond, a runoff of the lake before leaving both entirely as it reaches a junction with the northern terminus of VT 236 (State Park Road). The two routes merge, as VT 120 enters the town of Berkshire. In Berkshire, VT 120 jogs northeast and then turns east at a junction with Boston Post Road. Running through the hamlet of East Berkshire, the route reaches a junction with VT 108. This junction marks the eastern terminus of VT 120, just south of where VT 108 crosses the border.

History 
VT 120 was first designated for its entire length in 1961 by an act of the Vermont State Legislature.

Major intersections

References

External links

120
Transportation in Franklin County, Vermont